Ambon may refer to:

Places
 Ambon Island, an island in Indonesia
 Ambon, Maluku, a city on Ambon Island, the capital of Maluku province
 Governorate of Ambon, a colony of the Dutch East India Company from 1605 to 1796
 Ambon, Morbihan, a commune in Morbihan, France

Other uses
 Ambon (liturgy), the place directly in front of the Holy Doors of an Eastern Orthodox Church
 Battle of Ambon, a World War II battle between Allied and Japanese forces which occurred on the island in 1942

See also
 Ambo (disambiguation)
 Ambon white-eye, a species of bird